The 1988 Athens Open was a men's tennis tournament played on outdoor clay courts in Athens in Greece that was part of the 1988 Nabisco Grand Prix. It was the third edition of the tournament and was held from 13 June 13 until 20 June 1988. Eighth-seeded Horst Skoff won the singles title.

Finals

Singles

 Horst Skoff defeated  Bruno Orešar 6–3, 2–6, 6–2
 It was Skoff's 1st singles title of his career.

Doubles

 Rikard Bergh /  Per Henricsson defeated  Pablo Arraya /  Karel Nováček 6–4, 7–5
 It was Bergh's only title of the year and the 1st of his career. It was Henricsson's only title of the year and the 1st of his career.

See also
 1988 Athens Trophy – women's tournament

References

External links
 ITF tournament edition details

Athens Open
Athens Open
ATP Athens Open
June 1988 sports events in Europe